Ichamati River (also spelt Ichhamati), is a trans-boundary river which flows through India and Bangladesh and also forms the boundary between the two countries. The river is facing the problem of siltation leading to thin flow of water in the dry season and floods in the rainy season. Experts are handling the situation and remedial matters are being discussed between the governments of India and Bangladesh.

Ichamati flow
Ichamati River is now in three parts: (1) The longer part flows from the Mathabhanga River, a distributary of the Padma, and after flowing for  joins the Kalindi River near Hasnabad in North 24 Parganas and Debhata in Satkhira District. (2) Once the main river west of Dhaka and (3) Ichamati of Dinajpur. Rennel's map of 1764–66, shows the last two rivers as one. The second river marked above originates south of Jafarganj opposite to the mouth of the Hoorsagar near Nathpur factory and runs towards Joginighat in Munshiganj.

Lower Ichamati
The Mathabhanga River originates from the right bank of the Padma, at Munshiganj in Kushtia District in Bangladesh. It bifurcates near Majidia in Nadia District in India, creating two rivers, Ichamati and Churni.

The Bhairab once flowed from the Ganges, across the present beds of the Jalangi, and further eastwards towards Faridpur.  The Bhairab is no more a very active river.  The Mathabhanga is a younger stream than Jalangi and it was not until very recently that the river completed its junction with the Hooghly by adopting the River Churni (now its lower reaches) for its main course. Earlier most of the water of the Mathabhanga ran off to the east down the Kumara, Chitra, Coboduk (Bhairab), and Ichamati, but all these escape routes have been shut off, except a small amount for the Ichamati. The point to note is that while earlier the rivers in the region flowed in a south-easterly direction, but later some force pulled the Jalangi and the Mathabhanga in a south-westerly direction. The inference is that it occurred because of a local subsidence, which was active for some period prior to 1750 and which has since become inactive.

River bed raised

During the lean period the level of water in the Mathabhanga is higher than that of the Padma. As a result, no water enters the Ichamati during the dry season. One of the causes of silting of the river was construction of guard wall for railway over bridge. The river beds in the area need to be excavated in order that there is flow of water during the lean season. Since this is required to be done both in India and Bangladesh, there is need for accord on this point. The matter has been discussed at the ministerial level, the area surveyed to have better idea of the problems of the people in the affected area, and decisive action is expected in the near future.

The river zone also faces the problem of industrial pollution and forcible occupation of land by people. Arresting environmental hazards resulting from lack of sanitation facilities, encroachment, groundwater contamination like arsenic pollution, destruction of aquatic flora, fauna are some of the burning problem of the areas that needs to be tackled through participatory mechanism.

Naming
On 1 August 2022, the Chief Minister of West Bengal, Mamata Banerjee announced the creation of a new district Ichamati district which is named after this river. The district will be formed by bifurcating the North 24 Parganas district consisting of the area of Bangaon subdivision.

References

External links

Rivers of West Bengal
Rivers of Bangladesh
International rivers of Asia
Bangladesh–India border
Rivers of India
Rivers of Khulna Division
Border rivers